Late endosomal/lysosomal adaptor, MAPK and MTOR activator 4 is a protein that in humans is encoded by the LAMTOR4 gene.

References

Further reading